Art of Bleeding was a Los Angeles-based multi-media performance troupe providing darkly comic, faux-educational programs in first-aid and safety at clubs, galleries and art events. Staging shows from an actual ambulance, The Art of Bleeding creates what their press release refers to as a "paramedical funhouse" wherein puppets and costumed characters interact with a crew of nurses wearing medical-themed fetish gear. Events are hosted by costumed characters reminiscent of children's programming including the company's  "beloved mascot," Abram the Safety Ape and RT, the Robot Teacher. In their performances and web videos, the group promotes an ill-defined and intentionally cryptic metaphysical doctrine that they call "True Safety Consciousness."

The group's ambulance also functions as a mobile recording studio for their Gory Details Project, in which true-life tales of medical trauma are gathered from passersby to be shared in an online library of movies and mp3s.  Some of these stories are also re-enacted within the framework of what would appear to be a tragically misguided children's show, the "Gory Details" web series.

In addition to live shows, videos, recordings, and paramedical-themed music, The Art of Bleeding has also choreographed public performances of bandaged and crutch-enabled dancers, created grisly anatomical walk-through installations, and staged a parking-lot display of smoldering, freshly wrecked cars peopled with bloodied actors sharing their cautionary tales.

The troupe was founded by Al Ridenour, former leader of the Los Angeles branch of the Cacophony Society. When asked about the nature of his group, Ridenour has said, "Think of Art of Bleeding as a sort of public outreach multi-media brainwashing course in emergency medicine, and you'll have a good handle on it. At least better than me...".

Ridenour's then-wife Margaret Cho was featured in a March 29, 2006 performance.

References

External links
BoingBoing profile of Art of Bleeding's Swine Flu Quiz
       NO-FI "Magazine" Interview with RT The Teacher Robot by Garrett Faber
     NO-FI "Magazine" Interview with Abram The Safety Ape by Rich Polysorbate 60
Art of Bleeding profile in Bizarre Magazine by  Denise Stanborough

Theatre companies in Los Angeles
American performance artists
Performance artist collectives